Yusuf Izzet Pasha (born 1876 in Yozgat – died April 15, 1922 in Ankara) was a Turkish general of Circassian origin, who served both the Ottoman Army and the Turkish Army.

See also
List of high-ranking commanders of the Turkish War of Independence

Sources

External links

1876 births
1922 deaths
People from the Ottoman Empire of Circassian descent
People from Yozgat
Ottoman Military Academy alumni
Ottoman Military College alumni
Ottoman military personnel of the Greco-Turkish War (1897)
Ottoman military personnel of the Italo-Turkish War
Ottoman military personnel of the Balkan Wars
Ottoman military personnel of World War I
Ottoman Army generals
Turkish Army generals
Turkish military personnel of the Turkish War of Independence
Recipients of the Medal of Independence with Red Ribbon (Turkey)
Deputies of Bolu